Kaland is a village in Austrheim municipality in Vestland county, Norway. The village is located on the northwestern tip of the mainland Alver peninsula, just west of the Mongstad industrial area.

References

Villages in Vestland
Austrheim